Marius Cristian Negrea (born 27 October 1964) is a Romanian former competitive figure skater. He represented Romania at the 1992 Winter Olympics and the 1994 Winter Olympics, placing 27th in 1992 (failing to qualify for the free skate) and 19th in 1994. His best result at an ISU Championship was 15th at the 1992 European Championships in Lausanne, Switzerland.

Negrea is the 1995 Swiss national champion but did not compete for Switzerland internationally.

Following his competitive retirement, Negrea began working as a coach. His current and former students include Gheorghe Chiper, Adrian Matei, Roxana Luca and Julia Sauter. In 2018, he worked as a Winter Olympics commentator for Romanian Television.

Competitive highlights

References

Romanian male single skaters
Olympic figure skaters of Romania
Figure skaters at the 1994 Winter Olympics
Figure skaters at the 1992 Winter Olympics
Figure skating coaches
Living people
1964 births
Sportspeople from Brașov